Delvin Goh (born 14 April 1995) is a Singaporean basketball player who plays for the Singapore Slingers in the Asean Basketball League (ABL). When he first joined the Singapore Slingers in 2011, aged 16, he was given the nickname Wonderkid.

ABL career
Goh started off his career in 2011 when he was only 16 years old. He played for the Singapore Slingers.

ABL statistics
Goh's ABL statistics is in this link.

International career
Goh is also a member of the men's Singapore national basketball team and co-captain. He won the bronze medals for both 2013 Naypyidaw and 2015 Singapore. In 2016, Goh became the first Singaporean basketballer to join a foreign team in recent years, spending a month playing for the semi-pro Brunei team, the Beruang Blazers.

Filmography

See also
 FIBA Asia Championship
 Singapore national basketball team

References

1995 births
Living people
Centers (basketball)
Competitors at the 2013 Southeast Asian Games
Competitors at the 2015 Southeast Asian Games
Competitors at the 2017 Southeast Asian Games
Competitors at the 2019 Southeast Asian Games
Singapore Slingers players
Singaporean men's basketball players
Southeast Asian Games bronze medalists for Singapore
Southeast Asian Games medalists in basketball
Singaporean sportspeople of Chinese descent
21st-century Singaporean people